Nathan Wade Landwehr (born June 7, 1988) is an American mixed martial artist who competes in the Featherweight division of the Ultimate Fighting Championship. A professional mixed martial artist since 2012, he is also a former M-1 Global Featherweight Champion.

Background
Landwehr was born and grew up in Tennessee and attended Rossview High School. He played football from the third grade until the end of high school. He also wrestled and ran track throughout the high school. After high school, Landwehr attended Highland Community College for two academic years, where he ran track with scholarship.

Mixed martial arts career

Early career

Landwehr racked up a record of 8–2 in stateside circuit before signing with M-1 Global.

M-1 Global
Landwehr made his promotional debut against Mikhail Korobkov at M-1 Challenge 83 - Ragozin vs. Halsey on September 23, 2017. He won the fight via second-round knockout.

He made his sophomore appearance in M-1 against Viktor Kolesnik at M-1 Challenge 85: Ismagulov vs. Matias on November 10, 2017. He won the fight via split decision.

M-1 Global Featherweight Championship
Landwehr was scheduled to challenge Khamzat Dalgiev for the M-1 Global Featherweight Championship at M-1 Challenge 91 - Swain vs. Nuertiebieke on May 12, 2018. However, the event was cancelled for unknown reason. The bout was later rebooked to take place at M-1 Challenge 95 - Battle in the Mountains 7 on July 21, 2018. Landwehr captured the championship via second-round technical knockout.

In his second title defense, Landwehr faced Andrey Lezhnev on December 15, 2018, at M-1 Challenge 100. He won the spectacular fight by a third round TKO.

In his third defense, Landwehr faced Viktor Kolesnik on June 28, 2019, at M-1 Challenge 102. He won the fight via unanimous decision.

Ultimate Fighting Championship
Nate made his UFC debut against fellow newcomer Herbert Burns at UFC Fight Night: Blaydes vs. dos Santos on January 25, 2020. He lost the fight by knockout in the first round via a knee from the clinch.

Landwehr faced Darren Elkins on May 16, 2020 at UFC on ESPN: Overeem vs. Harris. He won the fight via unanimous decision.

Landwehr was scheduled to face Movsar Evloev on December 5, 2020, at UFC on ESPN: Hermansson vs. Vettori However, hours before the start, it was cancelled after Movsar tested positive for COVID-19.

Landwehr faced Julian Erosa on February 20, 2021, at UFC Fight Night: Blaydes vs. Lewis. He lost the fight via technical knockout in round one.

Landwehr was scheduled to face Makwan Amirkhani on June 5, 2021, at UFC Fight Night 189. However, Landwehr was pulled from the event due to injury and was replaced by Kamuela Kirk.

Landwehr faced Ľudovít Klein on October 16, 2021, at UFC Fight Night: Ladd vs. Dumont. He won the fight via a submission in round three. This win earned him the Performance of the Night award.

Landwehr was scheduled to face Lerone Murphy on March 26, 2022 at UFC Fight Night: Blaydes vs. Daukaus. However, Murphy withdrew from the bout for undisclosed reasons and he was replaced by David Onama. In turn, Landwehr had to pull out of the bout and the bout was scrapped.

Landwehr was scheduled to face Zubaira Tukhugov on August 6, 2022 at UFC on ESPN: Santos vs. Hill. However, Tukhugov withdraw due to experiencing difficulties securing a visa issues and was replaced by David Onama at UFC on ESPN: Vera vs. Cruz just a week after. Landwehr won the fight via majority decision. This fight earned him the Fight of the Night award.

Landwehr was scheduled to face Alex Caceres  on March 25, 2023 at UFC on ESPN 43. However, Caceres withdrew due to an undisclosed reason and was replaced by Austin Lingo.

Championships and accomplishments

Mixed martial arts
Ultimate Fighting Championship
Performance of the Night (One time) 
Fight of the Night (One time) 
M-1 Global
M-1 Global Featherweight Championship (One time)
Two successful title defenses
Gladiators of the Cage
GOTC Featherweight Championship (One time)
3FC
3FC Featherweight Championship (One time)

Mixed martial arts record

|-
|Win
|align=center|16–4
|David Onama
|Decision (majority)
|UFC on ESPN: Vera vs. Cruz
|
|align=center|3
|align=center|5:00
|San Diego, California, United States
||
|-
|Win
|align=center|15–4
|Ľudovít Klein
|Submission (anaconda choke)
|UFC Fight Night: Ladd vs. Dumont
|
|align=center|3
|align=center|2:22
|Las Vegas, Nevada, United States
|
|-
| Loss
| align=center|14–4
| Julian Erosa
| TKO (flying knee)
|UFC Fight Night: Blaydes vs. Lewis
|
|align=center|1
|align=center|0:56
|Las Vegas, Nevada, United States
|
|-
| Win
| align=center|14–3
| Darren Elkins
|Decision (unanimous)
|UFC on ESPN: Overeem vs. Harris
|
|align=center|3
|align=center|5:00
|Jacksonville, Florida, United States
|
|-
| Loss
| align=center|13–3
| Herbert Burns
| KO (knee)
| UFC Fight Night: Blaydes vs. dos Santos
| 
| align=center| 1
| align=center| 2:43
| Raleigh, North Carolina, United States
|
|-
| Win 
| align=center| 13–2
| Viktor Kolesnik
| Decision (unanimous)
| M-1 Challenge 102
| 
|align=center|5
|align=center|5:00
| Astana, Kazakhstan
| 
|-
| Win
| align=center| 12–2
| Andrey Lezhnev
| TKO (punches) 
|M-1 Challenge 100
|
|align=center|3
|align=center|3:10
|Atyrau, Kazakhstan
|
|-
| Win
| align=center| 11–2
| Khamzat Dalgiev
|TKO (punches)
|M-1 Challenge 95
|
|align=center|2
|align=center|4:35
|Nazran, Russia
|
|-
| Win
| align=center| 10–2
| Viktor Kolesnik
| Decision (split)
|M-1 Challenge 85 
|
|align=center| 3
|align=center| 5:00
|Moscow, Russia
|
|-
| Win
| align=center|9–2
| Mikhail Korobkov
|KO (punch)
|M-1 Challenge 83 
|
|align=center| 2
|align=center| 1:31
|Kazan, Russia
|
|-
| Win
| align=center|8–2
| Solon Staley
| Decision (unanimous)
| A&A Fight Time Promotions: November to Remember
| 
|align=center|3
|align=center|5:00
| Clarksville, Tennessee, United States
|
|-
| Win
| align=center|7–2
| Diego Saraiva
| TKO (punches)
| A&A Fight Time Promotions: A Night of Explosions
| 
| align=center| 1
| align=center| 4:47
| Clarksville, Tennessee, United States
|
|-
| Loss
| align=center|6–2
| Mark Cherico
| Submission (rear-naked choke)
| GOTC MMA 19
| 
| align=center|2
| align=center|1:34
| Cheswick, Pennsylvania, United States
|
|-
| Win
| align=center| 6–1
| Anthony Jones
| TKO (punches)
|State Line Promotions: BMF Invitational 6
| 
| align=center|2
| align=center|3:03
| Clarksville, Tennessee, United States
| 
|-
| Win
| align=center| 5–1
| Justin Steave
| Decision (unanimous)
| GOTC MMA 15
|
|align=center|3
|align=center|5:00
|Williamsport, Pennsylvania, United States
| 
|-
| Win
| align=center| 4–1
| Adam Townsend
| Decision (split)
| 3FC 20
| 
| align=center| 5
| align=center| 5:00
| Pigeon Forge, Tennessee, United States
| 
|-
| Win
| align=center| 3–1
| Keith Richardson
| KO (punch)
| XFC 26
| 
| align=center| 1
| align=center| 4:43
| Nashville, Tennessee, United States
| 
|-
| Loss
| align=center| 2–1
| D'Juan Owens
| Decision (unanimous)
| XFC 22
| 
| align=center| 3
| align=center| 5:00
| Charlotte, North Carolina, United States
| 
|-
| Win
| align=center| 2–0
| Chris Wright
| TKO (punches)
| XFC 20
| 
| align=center| 2
| align=center| 3:56
| Knoxville, Tennessee, United States
|
|-
| Win
| align=center| 1–0
| Billy Mullins
| KO (punches)
| XFC 18
| 
| align=center| 2
| align=center| 1:21
| Nashville, Tennessee, United States
|

See also 
 List of current UFC fighters
 List of male mixed martial artists

References

External links 
  
 

1988 births
Living people
American male mixed martial artists
Featherweight mixed martial artists
Mixed martial artists utilizing wrestling
Ultimate Fighting Championship male fighters
Mixed martial artists from Tennessee
People from Clarksville, Tennessee